Nampally Sarai" Tipu Khan sarai" is a heritage resting place (caravanserai) located at Nampally in Hyderabad, India.

The 'Nampally Sarai' or 'Tipu Khan Sarai"' was built by Nawab Tipu Khan Bahadur who was High Ranking Official, Elite Mansabdar and a great Noble and an Equestrian Legend. He had the privilege to impart training to H.H. Mir Mahboob Ali Khan-the sixth Nizam of Hyderabad, Deccan. Adjacent to Tipu khan sarai is situated Masjid-e-Tipu khan, still in good condition. Nawab Tipu Khan Bahadur was himself an extensive traveller who travelled five times journeying to the holy cities of Mecca and Medina for Hajj pilgrimage. The Nawab in his lifetime also travelled to Sri Lanka for business purpose.

Nawab Tipu Khan felt the need of Sarai's in his own home city Hyderabad henceforth gifted his resources for building a sarai that is now "Tipu khan sarai"nee"Nampally sarai". As per Islamic traditions Nawab Tipu Khan Bahadur in his lifetime provided free stay and ration to all guests at the sarai for three days, cooked food for non vegetarian guests and uncooked ration for vegetarian guests, with no distinction of caste or creed. He taught horse riding to Nawab Afzal-ud-Daula Mir Tahniyat Ali Khan Bahadur, Asaf Jah V, Nizam-ul-Mulk, Nizam of Hyderabad and later to His Highness Mir Mahboob Ali Khan Bahadur, Asaf Jah VI, The Prime Minister Sir Salar Jung I Mir Turab Ali Khan was impressed by his talent, knowledge and dedication. He used to keep him in his company and take advise on various matters relating to Army.

Nawab Tipu Khan Bahadur shared his knowledge by writing books on horses, which are important wealth of information and a valued treasure. In 1910 He built a bridge at Sangam of rivers Musi and Eisa known as Tipu Khan Bridge. In his honour Tipu Dwar is named after him at AOC Centre at Langar Houz. Even during the era of Mir Osman Ali Khan, the Bridge was dotted with plants and illumination at regular intervals, and trees were planted on both sides of the Bridge to give shade to the passers-by. The road was well planned, with milestones along the whole stretch. Some of these milestones can still be seen along the present. On another note, the road also facilitated the rapid movement of troops and of foreign invaders. The Tipu Khan Bridge continues to be one of the major route of Hyderabad City. For over one century, The Tipu Khan Bridge has remained "such a connectivity of life as nowhere else exists in Hyderabad.  Its high time the Government of Telangana protect it, declare it heritage property, install proper illumination and unveil his name plate on the bridge and recognise this great personality. Earlier in 1850 AD he had built a watch tower near Khairtabad known as Tipu’s Lookuout at the centre of the city’s highest point on an elevated hill for watching movement of travellers to the city. It also used for enemy approaching towards city side. It was one of the beautiful architectural marvel from where the whole city and outskirts can be viewed as well as the Golconda fort was also seen. One of his great grandsons, Wajahat Ahmed Khan, is an equestrian professional and releasing a book on the life Nawab Tipu Khan Bahadur.

Nawab Tipu Khan Bahadur was a true traveller whose life can be summed up more as a human who viewed life as a journey. The building originally known as Sulah Sarai (a peaceful resting place) was spread on area of  near Nampally. The location was chosen because of its proximity to the railway station and Carore giri (customs house).

It was also used a state guest house after 1948 by Government of Andhra Pradesh. In 2002, the government contemplated demolishing the structure and building a new one. In 2011, it received heritage site status from the government, because of the efforts of heritage activists and INTACH. The building is poorly maintained and in a dilapidated state. It was handed over to HMR who planned to use the Sarai as an overhead station and link it with Nampally railway station but the plan was put on hold due to protests. Presently GHMC plans to take it back from Hyderabad Metro to build a commercial complex in the same location.

See also
 Heritage structures in Hyderabad
Shaikpet Sarai
 Tipu Khan Bahadur

References

Medieval India
Heritage structures in Hyderabad, India
Hyderabad State
Tourist attractions in Hyderabad, India
Caravanserais in India